Aplomyopsis is a genus of flies in the family Tachinidae.

Species
Aplomyopsis brasiliensis Townsend, 1927
Aplomyopsis polita (Coquillett, 1897)

References

Diptera of North America
Diptera of South America
Exoristinae
Brachycera genera
Taxa named by Charles Henry Tyler Townsend